Schwalbach is a municipality in the district of Saarlouis, in Saarland, Germany. It is situated approximately 5 km east of Saarlouis, and 15 km northwest of Saarbrücken.

References

Saarlouis (district)